Synegiodes histrionaria is a species of moth of the family Geometridae first described by Charles Swinhoe in 1892. It is found in Taiwan and India.

Subspecies
Synegiodes histrionaria histrionaria
Synegiodes histrionaria ornata (Bastelberger, 1909) (Taiwan)

References

Moths described in 1892
Sterrhinae